The 1872 United States presidential election in Minnesota took place on November 5, 1872, as part of the 1872 United States presidential election. Voters chose five representatives, or electors to the Electoral College, who voted for president and vice president.

Minnesota voted for the Republican candidate, Ulysses S. Grant, over Liberal Republican candidate, Horace Greeley. Grant won Minnesota by a margin of 22.54%.

Results

See also
 United States presidential elections in Minnesota

References

Minnesota
1872
1872 Minnesota elections